Jürgen Gronau (born 25 August 1962) is a German former professional footballer who played as a midfielder.

References

External links
 
 

1962 births
Living people
German footballers
Association football midfielders
FC St. Pauli players
Bundesliga players
2. Bundesliga players